Creative evolution may refer to:

 Theistic evolution
 Creative Evolution (book), a book by Henri Bergson